6 Patrick Pool is a grade II* listed timber framed building in the city centre of York, in England.

The building was constructed in about 1600, as a three-storey, three-bay building.  Its original use is uncertain, and may have been social, or have been connected with the neighbouring St Sampson's Church.  Alternatively, it may have been used as a warehouse.  In the 18th century, it was converted into stables, and then in the 19th century into a warehouse.

Both the upper floors are jettied on the two long sides.  It is timber framed, with infill of brick tiles which are plastered.  Its rear wall has been partly rebuilt in orange brick, and the roof is tiled.  The internal timber framing survives intact, as does the original lime ash plaster of the attic floor.

By the mid-20th century, the building was in poor repair, but it was restored in 1960.  In 2007, it became the Pivni bar, which in 2022 was one of 17 York pubs listed in the Good Beer Guide.

References

External links

Patrick Pool
Timber framed buildings in Yorkshire